Vehicle-to-grid (V2G), also known as Vehicle-to-home (V2H), describes a system in which plug-in electric vehicles (PEV) sell demand response services to the grid. Demand services are either delivering electricity or by reducing their charging rate. Demand services reduce pressure on the grid, which might otherwise experience disruption from load variations.  Vehicle-to-load (V2L) is related, but the AC phase is not sychronised with the grid, so the power is only available to an "off grid" load.

Plug-in electric vehicles include battery electric vehicles (BEV), plug-in hybrids (PHEV), and hydrogen vehicles. They share the ability to generate electricity. That electricity is typically used to power the vehicle. However, at any given time 95% of cars are parked, while their energy sits unused. V2G envisions sending some of the stored power to the grid (or reducing charge rates to pull less power from the grid). A 2015 report found that vehicle owners could receive significant payments.

Batteries have a finite number of charging cycles, as well as a shelf-life, therefore V2G can impact battery longevity. Battery capacity is a complex function of battery chemistry, charge/discharge rates, temperature, state of charge and age, and evolves with improving technology. Most studies using slow discharge rates show only a few percent of additional degradation while one study suggested that using vehicles for grid storage could improve longevity.

Hydrogen fuel cell vehicles (FCV) with tanks containing 5.6 kg of hydrogen can deliver more than 90 kWh of electricity. Vehicle batteries may hold 100 kWh or more.

Reducing charge rates, termed uni-directional V2G, is technically simpler than delivering power which many PEVs are not equipped to do. UV2G can be extended by throttling other activities such as air heating/cooling.

History
V2G began as vehicle to vehicle (V2V) as laid out by California company AC Propulsion in the early 1990s. Their 2-seater Tzero car featured 2-way charging. V2G allows charging and discharging of the vehicle and the grid, dependent on different signals.

Applications

Peak load leveling
V2G vehicles can provide power to help balance grid loads by "valley filling" (charging at night when demand is low) and "peak shaving" (sending power to the grid when demand is high, see duck curve).  Peak load leveling supports regulation services (keeping voltage and frequency stable) and provides spinning reserves (to meet sudden demands for power). Coupling these services with "smart-meters" enables V2G. V2G could buffer variable power sources by storing excess energy and providing it to the grid during high load periods.

It has been proposed that public utilities would not have to build as many natural gas or coal-fired power plants to meet peak demand or as an insurance policy against power outages. Since demand can be measured locally by a simple frequency measurement, dynamic load leveling can be provided as needed on a highly local basis. Carbitrage, a portmanteau of 'car' and 'arbitrage', is sometimes used to refer to the process of buying and selling power stored in a vehicle.

Backup power
Electric vehicles can generally store more than an average home's daily energy demand.  Such a vehicle could supply emergency power to a home for several days, vehicle-to-home transmission (V2H).

Types
California's grid operator, CAISO, defines four levels of Vehicle-Grid Interface (VGI):

 Unidirectional power flow (V1G) 
 V1G with aggregated resources
 V1G with fragmented actor objectives
 Bidirectional power flow (V2G)

V1G/Unidirectional V2G 
V1G involves varying the time/rate at which an electric vehicle is charged. It is also known as unidirectional managed charging services, unidirectional V2G or "smart charging". V1G approaches include charging in the middle of the day to absorb solar power that would otherwise be discarded (shed), and varying the charge rate to provide frequency response or load balancing services.

Bidirectional local V2G (V2H , V2B, V2X) 
Vehicle-to-home (V2H) or vehicle-to-building (V2B) or vehicle-to-everything (V2X) uses the vehicle to provide back-up power during a power outage or to displace grid energy with energy from renewable sources. For example, vehicles charged using solar power at work during the day could power a home through the night, without pulling power from the grid.

As of 2022 V2X had not yet reached market deployment, apart from Japan where commercial V2H solutions have been available since 2012. Utrecht is installing thousands of bidirectional chargers in anticipation of the arrival of vehicles that support bidirectional energy flows.

Bidirectional V2G 
V2G allows vehicles to provide electricity to the grid. The utility or transmission system operator purchases energy from customers. In many jurisdictions meeting power demands during periods of peak demand is much more expensive than at other times. Power from EVs is a potentially lower cost alternative. In addition, EV power can facilitate ancillary services such as balancing and frequency control, including primary frequency regulation and secondary reserve.

V2G requires specialized hardware (e.g., bi-directional inverters), has significant losses and limited round-trip efficiency, and the charge/discharge cycling may shorted battery life. Revenues from V2G in a Southern California Edison pilot project were lower than project administration costs, eliminating its economic benefits.

Efficiency 
Most modern battery electric vehicles use lithium-ion cells that offer round-trip efficiency greater than 90%. Efficiency depends on factors like charge rate, charge state, battery state of health, and temperature.
 
The majority of losses are in system components other than the battery. Power electronics such as inverters typically dominate losses. A study found round-trip efficiency for V2G system in the range of 53% to 62%.  Another study reports efficiency of about 70%. Overall efficiency depends on multiple factors and can vary widely.

Implementation by country

A study conducted in 2012 by Idaho National Laboratory reported estimates and plans for V2G in various countries. The potential is difficult to quantify because the technology is still nascent.

United States
In July 2022, eight electric school buses in the San Diego Gas & Electric service territory were part of the first V2G project intended to boost reliability during electric emergencies. Using V2G software from Nuvve, the bus batteries are aggregated with others in a nearby school district to form a participating resource under the Emergency Load Reduction Program (ELRP), which was started in 2021 by the California Public Utilities Commission. SDG&E, Pacific Gas and Electric and Southern California Edison manage the five-year ELRP pilot.

In September 2022, the BIDIRECTIONAL Act was introduced in the US Senate, to "create a program dedicated to deploying electric school buses with bidirectional vehicle-to-grid (V2G) flow capability.”

In North America, at least two major school-bus manufacturers—Blue Bird and Lion—are working on proving the benefits of electrification and V2G technology. As of 2020, school buses in the U.S. used $3.2B of diesel a year; their electrification could potentially help stabilize the electrical grid, lessen the need for power plants, and reduce exposure to exhaust.

In 2017, at University of California San Diego, V2G technology provider Nuvve launched a pilot program called INVENT, funded by the California Energy Commission, with the installation of 50 V2G bi-directional charging stations around the campus. The program expanded in 2018 to include a fleet of PEVs for its Triton Rides shuttle service.

In 2018 Nissan launched a pilot program under the Nissan Energy Share initiative in partnership with V2G systems company Fermata Energy to use V2G technology to partially power Nissan North America's headquarters in Franklin, Tennessee. In 2020 Fermata Energy's bidirectional electric vehicle charging system became the first to be certified to the North American safety standard, UL 9741, the Standard for Bidirectional Electric Vehicle (EV) Charging System Equipment.

Japan
Japan planned to spend $71.1 billion to upgrade existing grid infrastructure. Average Japanese homes use 10 to 12 KWh/day. The Nissan Leaf's 24 KWh battery capacity, could potentially provide up to two days of power.

In November 2018 in Toyota City, Aichi Prefecture, Toyota Tsusho Corporation and Chubu Electric Power Co., Inc initiated VsG demonstrations with electric vehicles. The demonstration examined how V2G systems balance demand and supply and power grid impacts. Two bi-directional charging stations, connected to a V2G aggregation server managed by Nuvve Corporation, were installed at a parking lot in Aichi Prefecture.

Denmark
The Edison Project intends to install enough turbines to accommodate 50% of Denmark's total power needs, while using V2G to protect the grid. The Edison Project plans to use PEVs while they are plugged into the grid to store additional wind energy that the grid cannot handle. Then, during peak energy use hours, or when the wind is calm, the power stored in these PEVs will be fed into the grid. To aid in the acceptance of PEVs, zero emission vehicles received subsidies.

Following the Edison project, the Nikola project was started which focused on demonstrating V2G technology in a lab setting, located at the Risø Campus (DTU). DTU is a partner along with Nuvve and Nissan. The Nikola project completed in 2016, laying the groundwork for Parker, which used a fleet of EVs to demonstrate the technology in a real-life setting. This project is partnered by DTU, Insero, Nuvve, Nissan and Frederiksberg Forsyning (Danish DSO in Copenhagen). The partners explored commercial opportunities by systematically testing and demonstrating V2G services across car brands. Economic and regulatory barriers were identified as well as the economic and technical impacts of the applications on the power system and markets. The project started in August 2016 and ended in September 2018.

United Kingdom
Starting in January 2011, programs and strategies to assist in PEV adoption were implemented.

In 2018, EDF Energy announced a partnership with Nuvve, to install up to 1,500 Vehicle to Grid (V2G) chargers. The chargers were to be offered to EDF Energy's business customers and at its own sites to provide up to 15 MW of energy storage capacity.

In October 2019, a consortium called Vehicle to Grid Britain (V2GB) released a research report on the potential of V2G technologies.

Poland
Solaris opened a Charging Park in Bolechowo, Poland on September 29, 2022 which will be used to test charging and discharging of e-vehicles.

Australia 

Since 2020, the Australian National University's Realising Electric Vehicle-to-grid Services (REVS) team has been studying the reliability and viability of vehicle-to-grid at scale, spinning off the Battery Storage and Grid Integration Project initiative.

In 2022 the first V2G charger became available to purchase in Australia, delays in roll-out have occurred due to regulatory processes (each State Power Authority needs to certify them compliant (after the Australian approval). There are also limitations in uptake due to high price and the fact that very few Electric Vehicles (EVs) are approved to use V2G (at present, only the Nissan Leaf EV and some Mitsubishi hybrid EVs). This roll-out follows Australian National University researchers' production of the ‘A to Z of V2G’, a comprehensive review of international V2G projects.

Research

Edison 
Denmark's Edison project, an abbreviation for 'Electric vehicles in a Distributed and Integrated market using Sustainable energy and Open Networks' was a partially state funded research project on the island of Bornholm in Eastern Denmark. The consortium included IBM, Siemens the hardware and software developer EURISCO, Denmark's largest energy company Ørsted (formerly DONG Energy), the regional energy company Østkraft, the Technical University of Denmark and the Danish Energy Association. It explored how to balance the unpredictable electricity loads generated by Denmark's wind farms, then generating approximately 20 percent of the country's electricity, by using PEVs and their accumulators. The aim of the project is to develop necessary infrastructure. At least one rebuilt V2G-capable Toyota Scion will be used in the project. The project was important in Denmark's efforts to expand its wind-power generation to 50% by 2020. According to a source of British newspaper The Guardian 'It's never been tried at this scale' previously. The project concluded in 2013.

E.ON and gridX 
In 2020, the utility company E.ON developed a V2H solution with gridX. The two companies implemented their solution in a private household to test the interaction of a PV system, battery storage and bidirectional charging. The house is equipped with three batteries with a combined capacity of 27 kWh, a DC charger and a PV system of 5.6 kWp. A 40 kWh Nissan Leaf was used.

Southwest Research Institute
In 2014, Southwest Research Institute (SwRI) developed the first V2G aggregation system qualified by the Electric Reliability Council of Texas (ERCOT). The system allows owners of electric delivery truck fleets to participate. When the grid frequency drops below 60 Hertz, the system suspends vehicle charging, removing that load on the grid, allowing the frequency to rise towards normal. The system operates autonomously.

The system was originally developed as part of the Smart Power Infrastructure Demonstration for Energy Reliability and Security (SPIDERS) Phase II program, led by Burns and McDonnell Engineering Company, Inc. In November 2012, SwRI was awarded a $7 million contract from the U.S. Army Corps of Engineers to demonstrate V2G. In 2013, SwRI researchers tested five DC fast-charge stations. The system passed integration and acceptance testing in August 2013.

Delft University of Technology
Prof. Dr. Ad van Wijk, Vincent Oldenbroek and Dr. Carla Robledo, researchers at Delft University of Technology, in 2016 conducted research on V2G technology with hydrogen FCEVs. Both experimental work with V2G FCEVs and techno-economic scenario studies for 100% renewable integrated energy and transport systems were done, using hydrogen and electricity as energy carriers. They modified a Hyundai ix35 FCEV to deliver up to 10 kW DC Power while maintaining road ready. With Accenda they developed a V2G unit converting the vehicle's DC power into 3-phase AC power and injecting it into the grid. The Future Energy Systems Group tested whether FCEVs could offer frequency reserves.

University of Delaware
Kempton, Advani, and Prasad conducted V2G research. Kempton published articles on the technology and the concept.

An operational implementation in Europe was conducted via the German government-funded MeRegioMobil project with Opel as vehicle partner and utility EnBW providing grid expertise. Other investigators are the Pacific Gas and Electric Company, Xcel Energy, the National Renewable Energy Laboratory, and, in the United Kingdom, the University of Warwick.

In 2010, Kempton and Poilasne co-founded Nuvve, a V2G solutions company. The company formed industry partnerships and implemented V2G pilot projects on five continents.

Lawrence Berkeley National Laboratory
Lawrence Berkeley National Laboratory developed V2G-Sim, a simulation platform used to model spatial and temporal driving and charging behavior of individual PEVs on the grid. Its models investigate the challenges and opportunities of V2G services, such as modulation of charging time and charging rate for peak demand response and utility frequency regulation. Preliminary findings indicated that controlled V2G service can provide peak-shaving and valley-filling services to balance daily electric load and mitigate the duck curve. Uncontrolled vehicle charging was shown to exacerbate the duck curve.

V2G-Sim reported that V2G would have minor battery degradation impacts on PEVs as compared to cycling losses and calendar aging. Assuming daily V2G service from 7PM to 9PM at a charging rate of 1.440 kW, the incremental capacity losses over ten years were 2.68%, 2.66%, and 2.62%.

Nissan and Enel
In May 2016, Nissan and Enel power company announced a collaborative V2G trial in the United Kingdom. The trial used 100 V2G charging units including Nissan Leaf and e-NV200 electric vans.

University of Warwick
WMG and Jaguar Land Rover collaborated with the Energy and Electrical Systems group of the university. Uddin analysed commercially available PEVs over a two-year period. He created a model of battery degradation and discovered that some patterns of vehicle-to-grid storage were able to significantly increase battery longevity over conventional charging strategies, given typical driving patterns.

Drawbacks
The more a battery is used the sooner it needs replacing. As of 2016 replacement cost was approximately 1/3 the cost of the car.  Batteries degrade with use. JB Straubel, then CTO of Tesla Inc, discounted V2G claiming that battery wear outweighs economic benefit. A 2017 study found decreasing capacity, and a 2012 hybrid-EV study found minor benefit.

A 2015 study found that economic analyses favorable to V2G failed to include many of the less obvious costs associated with its implementation. When these less obvious costs are included, the study reported that V2G was an economically inefficient solution.

Another common criticism related to efficiency is that cycling power into and out of a battery, which includes "inverting" the DC power to AC inevitably incurs losses. This cycle of energy efficiency may be compared with the 70–80% efficiency of large-scale pumped-storage hydroelectricity.

In order for V2G to be useful, it must be on a large scale basis. Power companies must be willing to adopt the technology in order to allow vehicles to give power to the power grid. For vehicles to power the grid, "smart-meters" would have to be in place in order to support the accounting.

See also 

 Charge control
 Charging station
 Distributed generation
 Electranet
 Electric vehicle battery
 Electricity meter
 Energy demand management
 Feed-in tariff
 Grid energy storage
 Grid-tied electrical system
 Load profile
 Load balancing (electrical power)
 Operating reserve
 Peaking power plant
 Power outage
 RechargeIT
 Smart meter
 Solid-state battery

References

Further reading

External links

Automotive technologies
Electric vehicles
Renewable energy economy
Energy storage
Sustainable energy
Grid energy storage